Emsurina is a genus of trilobites in the order Phacopida, that existed during the upper Cambrian in what is now Russia. It was described by Sivov in 1955, and the type species is Emsurina sibirica. The type locality was the Tolstochikhin Formation in Salair.

References

External links
 Emsurina at the Paleobiology Database

Pilekiidae
Phacopida genera
Fossil taxa described in 1955
Cambrian trilobites
Fossils of Russia